The Merlin-class packet boat of 1838 was a Sir William Symonds (the Surveyor of the Navy) design that was approved on 2 April 1838. The vessels were to be built for steam mail packet service on the Liverpool to Dublin route. The initial two ships ( and ) were ordered in the fall of 1838 from Pembroke Dockyard. The third vessel was ordered in 1839, also from Pembroke. When completed all vessels were used on the Liverpool station. In 1848 all three were in the Mediterranean on mail packet service. Merlin went to the Baltic during the Russian Was as a survey ship. Medusa went to the Black Sea. Medina remained in the Mediterranean being converted to a survey ship for Mediterranean service. Merlin served on the West Coast of Africa and was sold for commercial use in 1863. Medina  was sold at Malta in April 1864. Medusa was converted to a tugboat in 1861 and remained in that service until sold in 1872.

Merlin was the twelfth named vessel since it was used for a 10-gun pinnace, built in 1579 and listed until 1601.

Medusa was the fourth named vessel since it was used for a 50-gun fourth rate, launched at Plymouth Dockyard on 23 July 1785 and wrecked on the coast of Portugal on 26 November 1798.

Medina was the third named vessel since it was used for a six gun yacht (named Portsmouth) launched at Portsmouth Dockyard on 9 January 1702, rebuilt and named Medina in August 1772 and broken in August 1832.

Design and specifications
The first two vessels were laid down in April and May 1838 with the third vessel laid down in June 1839. The first two were launched in the fall of 1838 with the last vessel launched in 1840. The ships' tonnage calculation was  tons burthen.

Their machinery was supplied by Fawcett, Preston & Company of Liverpool. They had a pair rectangular fire tube boilers install. They had a pair of vertical single expansion (VSE) steam engines, rated at 312 nominal horsepower, that drove their paddlewheels. The vessels had a very light armament of two 6-pounder carronades mounted.

All vessels were completed at an average cost of £35,276.

Notes

Citations

References
 Lyon Winfield, The Sail & Steam Navy List, All the Ships of the Royal Navy 1815 to 1889, by David Lyon & Rif Winfield, published by Chatham Publishing, London © 2004, 
 The Navy List, published by His Majesty's Stationery Office, London
 Winfield, British Warships in the Age of Sail (1817 – 1863), by Rif Winfield, published by Seaforth Publishing, England © 2014, e, Chapter 11 Paddle Vessels (Wooden), Vessels Acquired after November 1830, Merlin class
 Colledge, Ships of the Royal Navy, by J.J. Colledge, revised and updated by Lt Cdr Ben Warlow and Steve Bush, published by Seaforth Publishing, Barnsley, Great Britain, © 2020, e  (EPUB), Section M (Merlin, Medina, Medusa)

 
Ships built in Pembroke Dock